Gil-Robles is the surname of:
Álvaro Gil-Robles, b. 1944, Spanish lawyer, jurist and human rights activist
Enrique Gil Robles, 1849–1908, Spanish scholar and politician 
José María Gil-Robles, 1935–2023, Spanish European politician
José María Gil-Robles y Quiñones, 1898–1980, Spanish advocate and politician

Compound surnames
Spanish-language surnames